Crawford Estates is an organized hamlet in the rural municipality of Edenwold No. 158 in Saskatchewan. It was established as an organized hamlet on 1 January 2002. It has a population of 60 people according to the 2006 Canada Census, and had a population of 50 in 2001.

References

Edenwold No. 158, Saskatchewan
Organized hamlets in Saskatchewan
Division No. 6, Saskatchewan